Samuel Briddon (26 July 1915 – June 1975) was an English professional footballer who played as a right half in the Football League for Swansea Town and Brentford.

Personal life 
After his retirement from football in 1946, Briddon became a miner.

Career statistics

References

1915 births
1975 deaths
People from Alfreton
Footballers from Derbyshire
English footballers
Association football wing halves
Port Vale F.C. players
Teversal F.C. players
Brentford F.C. players
Swindon Town F.C. players
Swansea City A.F.C. players
Bolton Wanderers F.C. wartime guest players
West Ham United F.C. wartime guest players
Brentford F.C. wartime guest players
English Football League players